The Eleutheros Cooke House at 410 Columbus Avenue in Sandusky, Ohio is the oldest surviving house in Sandusky.  It is a Greek Revival style house that was built in 1827 by Eleutheros Cooke, one of the first settlers in the area and its first lawyer.  The original front porch of the house saw General William Henry Harrison receive a flag from the women of Sandusky, in 1835.

It was listed on the National Register of Historic Places in 1982.

See also
Eleutheros Cooke House (1415 Columbus Avenue, Sandusky, Ohio), also built by Eleutheros Cooke, on the same street

References

Houses on the National Register of Historic Places in Ohio
Greek Revival houses in Ohio
Buildings and structures in Sandusky, Ohio
Houses completed in 1827
Houses in Erie County, Ohio
National Register of Historic Places in Erie County, Ohio
1827 establishments in Ohio